Markus Niemeläinen (born 8 June 1998) is a Finnish professional ice hockey defenceman currently playing for the Bakersfield Condors of the American Hockey League (AHL) as a prospect for the Edmonton Oilers of the National Hockey League (NHL). He was selected by the Oilers in the third-round, 63rd overall, of the 2016 NHL Entry Draft.

Playing career
Niemeläinen began playing hockey in the junior teams of HPK and Tappara in his native Finland. He was then drafted to play for the Saginaw Spirit of the Ontario Hockey League in 2015 where he posted 26 assists in his first season. He was drafted 63rd overall by the Edmonton Oilers in the 2016 NHL Entry Draft but was not signed to a contract and after a second season in Saginaw, Niemeläinen rejoined HPK in 2017.

On 30 April 2020, Niemeläinen signed a two-year entry level contract with the Edmonton Oilers of the National Hockey League

Career statistics

Regular season and playoffs

International

Awards & honors

References

External links

1998 births
Living people
Bakersfield Condors players
Edmonton Oilers draft picks
Edmonton Oilers players
Finnish ice hockey defencemen
HPK players
Lempäälän Kisa players
Saginaw Spirit players
People from Kuopio
Sportspeople from North Savo